Malfatti can refer to any of the following:

People
Anita Malfatti (1889–1964), Brazilian artist
Franco Maria Malfatti (1927–1991), Italian politician
Gian Francesco Malfatti (1731–1807), Italian mathematician
Johann Baptist Malfatti von Monteregio (1775–1859), Italian-Austrian physician
Lorenzo Malfatti (1923–2007), American operatic tenor
Marina Malfatti (1940–2016), Italian actress
Radu Malfatti (born 1943), Austrian trombone player
Therese Malfatti (1792–27 April 1851), Austrian musician

Other
Malfatti, a variant of gnocchi

See also
Malfatti circles, geometric figure
Malfatti Commission (1970–1972), European Commission

Italian-language surnames